Heath Mynd is a hill in the English county of Shropshire. At a height of  it is fairly unnotable except for its Marilyn status, a feature caused by the sharp drop on all sides. It is connected to Corndon Hill by a low col, and is only just inside England, being just one mile from the border with Wales. The nearby village is Norbury; nearest towns are Bishop's Castle and Church Stretton. Its nearest neighbour (visible in the photo) is called Cefn Gunthly.

References

Marilyns of England
Hills of Shropshire